The BM-14 (BM for Boyevaya Mashina, 'combat vehicle'), is a Soviet-made 140mm multiple launch rocket system (MLRS), normally mounted on a truck.

The BM-14 can fire 140 mm M-14 rockets with a high-explosive fragmentation warhead, a smoke warhead or a chemical warhead. It is similar to the BM-13 "Katyusha" and was partly replaced in service by the 122 mm BM-21 Grad.

Launchers were built in 16 and 17-round variants.

The weapon is not accurate as there is no guidance system, but it is extremely effective in saturation fire.

Variants

 BM-14 (8U32) - 16-round model (two rows of 8), launcher mounted on the ZIS-151 truck. Entered service in 1952. Also known as BM-14-16.
 BM-14M (2B2) -  modified model, mounted on the ZIL-157.
 BM-14MM (2B2R) - final upgrade, mounted on the ZIL-131.
 BM-14-17 (8U35) - 17-round (8+9 launch tubes) launcher, mounted on the GAZ-63A. Developed in 1959. This launcher was also used on naval vessels, for example Project 1204 patrol boats.
 BM-14-17M (8U35M) -  modified model, mounted on the GAZ-66.
 RPU-14 (8U38) - towed 16-round version, based on the carriage of the 85mm gun D-44 and used by Soviet Airborne Troops, where it was replaced by the 122mm BM-21V "Grad-V".

Ammunition
The BM-14 launcher and its variants can fire 140mm rockets of the M-14-series (also called Soviet-made M14 artillery rockets). The M-14 series consist of three known types:
 M-14-OF - an M-14 rocket with a high-explosive fragmentation warhead containing  of TNT.
 M-14-D - an M-14 rocket with a smoke warhead containing white phosphorus.
 M-14-S - an M-14 rocket with a chemical warhead containing  of sarin.

Use
During the Syrian Civil War, a rocket engine from a 140 mm M-14-series rocket was identified on 26 August 2013 by the U.N. fact-finding mission in the Muadamiyat al-Sham district southwest of Damascus, allegedly originating from the chemical attack on Western Ghouta on 21 August 2013.

The rockets nozzle assembly had 10 jet nozzles ordered evenly in a circle with an electrical contact plate in the middle. The bottom ring of the rocket engine had the lot number "Г ИШ 4 25 - 6 7 - 179 К" engraved, which means it was produced in 1967 by factory 179 (Sibselmash plant in Novosibirsk). However, no warhead was observed at the impact site and none of the 13 environmental samples taken in the Western Ghouta area tested positive for sarin, although three had "degradation and/or by-products" possibly originating from sarin. On 18 September, the Russian Presidential Chief of Staff Sergei Ivanov commented on the U.N. missions findings. He said "these rockets were supplied to dozens of countries", but that "the Soviet Union never supplied warheads with sarin to anyone". Another type of rockets was used in the Eastern Ghouta attack.

Operators

Current operators
 
 
  - 48 BM-14/16 
  - A number destroyed during the Angolan Civil War.
 
  - 20 BM-14-16 
 
 - 32 
  - Indonesian Marine Corps (Korps Marinir) operates 36 BM-14/17 launchers. Replaced by RM-70 Grad in 2003.
 
 
 
 
  - 50 BM-13, BM-14.
  - 200 BM-14
  - 200 BM-14 purchased in 1967. Still in service 
  - fielded during the Vietnam War from 1967
  -30

Former operators
  - Passed on to successor states in 1991.
 - retired

Similar designs
 The Type 63 130mm multiple rocket launcher (not to be confused with the towed Type 63 of 107mm) is the Chinese version of the BM-14-17. It has a slightly smaller calibre but is fitted with 19 instead of 17 launch tubes. The Type 63 MRL is based on the Nanjing NJ-230 or 230A 4x4 truck, a licence-produced version of the Soviet GAZ-63/63A.
 The WP-8z was a Polish towed rocket launcher that was developed in 1960. The weapon was subsequently produced between 1964 and 1965. It fired the same rockets as the RPU-14 but had only 8 launch tubes. The main operator was the 6th Pomeranian Airborne Division. with 12-18 WP-8s in its inventory.

See also 
BM-12 multiple rocket launcher
 Katyusha World War II multiple rocket launchers (BM-13, BM-8, and BM-31)
 M16 (rocket), U.S. 4.5 inch multiple rocket launcher
 BM-21 Grad 122 mm multiple rocket launcher
 BM-27 Uragan 220 mm multiple rocket launcher

References

External links

Use of BM-14 by the Taliban
Description of BM-14
Use of BM-14 by Cuban Armed Forces
Range and Payload
Algerian use of BM-14 as of 1993
Walk-around of Type 63 130mm MRL

Bibliography
 
 
 

Cold War artillery of the Soviet Union
Multiple rocket launchers of the Soviet Union
Chemical weapon delivery systems
Military equipment introduced in the 1950s